Effects Associates is a physical-effects facility based in Pinewood Studios and one of the longest serving such companies in Europe. It is a division of the digital visual effects and post-production facility Cinesite (Europe) Ltd.

History

Effects Associates was established in 1972 by a group of four British special effects supervisors, including Martin Gutteridge. Gutteridge bought out his partners by 1981 and in 1999 the company was purchased by Cinesite (Europe) Ltd. Together, the companies offer a full visual effects service.

Awards and nominations that Effects Associates and its affiliated supervisors have received include Emmy Award nominations for Hornblower series 2, Cleopatra, Ironclads and War and Remembrance; an Oscar for Alien (Special Effects Supervisor Nick Allder); Oscar and BAFTA nominations for Little Shop of Horrors; and a BAFTA award for The Fifth Element.

Directors Effects Associates have worked with include Richard Loncraine, Guillermo del Toro, Stanley Kubrick, Tim Burton, Ang Lee and Sydney Pollack.

Services

Effects Associates houses one of the largest effects equipment-hire stores in Europe. They also provide special-effects services including pyrotechnics, atmospherics, special effects supervision and technicians, mechanical effects and maritime effects.

Previous projects
The Dark is Rising
Blood and Chocolate
The Da Vinci Code
Wimbledon
Hellboy
Thunderbirds
Blade II
Enigma
Eyes Wide Shut
Notting Hill
The Peacemaker
Sense and Sensibility

External links
Cinesite's website

Mass media companies established in 1972
Visual effects companies
1972 establishments in England